Unlimited Power is a self-help book by author and motivational speaker Tony Robbins. 

It was published by Fawcett Columbine (Ballantine Books) in 1986.

It was reviewed by Publishers Weekly and Kirkus.

References

1986 non-fiction books
Self-help books
Ballantine Books books
American non-fiction books